Asja Maregotto (born 9 January 1997) is an Italian lightweight rower world champion at senior level at the World Rowing Championships.

Biography
Maregotto started the activity in 2009, having her senior debut in 2017. In addition to the international medal won at a senior level, at the youth level she won two more medals.

Achievements

References

External links
 

1997 births
Living people
Italian female rowers
World Rowing Championships medalists for Italy